Hermann Rudolph Schaum (29 April 1819 in Glauchau (formerly Glachau) – 15 September 1865 in Bonn) was a professor in Berlin and an entomologist. He specialised in Coleoptera.

Up until 1847, he worked as a general practitioner in Stettin, afterwards traveling to England, North America and Egypt, where he accumulated an impressive collection of insects. He later served as a professor of entomology at the University of Berlin. On September 15, 1865, he died in Bonn from consequences of a stroke. 

The beetle species Diochus schaumi is named after him. Schaum was a Member of the Entomological Society of Stettin.

Selected works 
 "Analecta entomologica", 1841.
 Verzeichniss der Lamellicornia mélitophila, 1841.
 "Catalogus coleopterorum Europae", 1852 - Catalog of European Coleoptera.
 Naturgeschichte der Insecten Deutschlands, (from 1860, with Wilhelm Ferdinand Erichson, Ernest August Hellmuth von Kiesenwetter and Ernst Gustav Kraatz) - Natural history of German entomology. 
 Necrophilus arenarius Roux, die mutmassliche Larve von Nemoptera, 1860 - "Necrophilus arenarius", the alleged larvae of Nemoptera. 
 "Descriptions of four new genera of Carabidae" (English translation in 1863).
 "Contributions to the knowledge of the Cicindelidae of tropical Asia containing descriptions of new species, a list of those hitherto described, and synonymical notes, (English translation in 1866).

References 

German entomologists
1819 births
1865 deaths
Coleopterists